László Molnár (29 June 1902 – 28 July 1981) was a Hungarian coxswain.

Molnár competed at the 1936 Summer Olympics in Berlin with the men's coxed four where they came fifth. He also competed in the coxed pair, with Károly Győry and Tibor Mamusich as team members, but they did not start in their semi-final race.

References

1902 births
1981 deaths
Hungarian male rowers
Olympic rowers of Hungary
Rowers at the 1936 Summer Olympics
People from Kiskunfélegyháza
Coxswains (rowing)
European Rowing Championships medalists
Sportspeople from Bács-Kiskun County